Legislative elections were held in New Caledonia on 11 September 1977. Anti-autonomy parties won 19 of the 35 seats.

Campaign
A total of 495 candidates contested the elections, representing 19 parties. For the first time, parties were allowed party political broadcasts on radio and television, with time allocated on the basis of seats held in the outgoing Assembly and local government. The campaign was described by Pacific Islands Monthly as "exceptionally savage".

Results
Women were elected to the Assembly for the first time, with Marie-Paule Serve and Edwige Antier winning seats. Of the 35 elected members, 22 were new to the Assembly.

Anti-autonomy parties (Rally for Caledonia, the Caledonian Liberal Movement, the New Caledonian Union, the Union for Caledonian Renewal, the All Ethnicity Union and the Democratic Union) won 19 seats; pro-independence parties (the Caledonian Union, the Party of Kanak Liberation and the United Front of Kanak Liberation) won 12 seats, with the remaining four held by pro-autonomy parties (the Caledonian Socialist Party and the Melanesian Progressive Union).

Elected members

References

New Caledonia
Elections in New Caledonia
1977 in New Caledonia
New Caledonia
Election and referendum articles with incomplete results